Kaura Namoda is a Local Government Area in Zamfara State, Nigeria. Its headquarters are in the town of Kaura-Namoda, home to the Federal Polytechnic, Kaura-Namoda.
It has an area of 868 km and a population of 281,367 at the 2006 census.

Historical Origin 
Kaura Namoda was founded in 1807 by Muhammadu Namoda who was a prince of Alibawa ruling family of Zurmi and an 18th century military genius.

Postal code 
The postal code of the area is 882.

Transport 

It is served by a station at the terminus of a branch line of the western line of the national railway network.  In 2014, this line is proposed to be rehabilitated and extended to Niamey in Niger.

See also 

 Railway stations in Nigeria

References 

Local Government Areas in Zamfara State